Edwin Carr may refer to:

 Edwin Carr (composer) (1926–2003), New Zealand composer of classical music
 Edwin Carr (athlete) (1928–2018), Australian athlete
 Slip Carr (Edwin William Carr, 1899–1971), his father, Australian rugby union player and Olympic sprinter